Axel Olof Bertil Elofs (20 November 1903 – 2 October 1983) was a Swedish long-distance runner. He competed in the marathon at the 1928 Summer Olympics.

References

External links
 

1903 births
1983 deaths
Athletes (track and field) at the 1928 Summer Olympics
Swedish male long-distance runners
Swedish male marathon runners
Olympic athletes of Sweden
Sportspeople from Dalarna County